Rimellopsis powisii, common name Powis's tibia,  is a species of large sea snail, a marine gastropod mollusks in the family Rostellariidae within the Stromboidea, the true conchs and their allies.

Description
The length of the shell varies between 30 mm and 75 mm.

Distribution
This marine species occurs from Southern Japan, and in the Indo-West Pacific to New Caledonia and Queensland, Australia

References

 Petit, S. 1840. Descriptions de deux espèces de coquilles nouvelles, appartenant aux genres Rostellaria et Murex, par M. Petit de la Saussaye. Revue Zoologique par la Société Cuvierienne 3: 326-327
 Schepman, M.M. 1908. The Prosobranchia of the Siboga Expedition. Rhipidoglossa and Docoglossa. With an appendix by Prof. R. Bergh [Pectinobranchiata]. Siboga-Expéditie Report 49a(1): pp. 1–108, 9 pls.
 Romagna-Manoja, E. 1977. Family Strombidae. part 4. Genus Tibia Roeding, 1798. La Conchiglia 95-96(3-13)
 Higo, S., Callomon, P. & Goto, Y. 1999. Catalogue and Bibliography of the Marine Shell-bearing Mollusca of Japan. Japan : Elle Scientific Publications 749 pp. 
 Kreipl, K. & Poppe, G.T. 1999. The family Strombidae. 1-59, pls 1-130 in Poppe, G.T. & Groh, K. (eds). Conchological Iconography. Hackenheim, Germany : ConchBooks. 
 Okutani, T. 2000. Marine mollusks in Japan. Tokai University Press 1173 pp. 
 Kronenberg, G.C. & Burger, A.W. 2002. On the subdivision of recent Tibia-like gastropods (Gastropoda, Stromboidea) with the recognition of the family Rostellariidae Gabb, 1868, and a note on the type species of Tibia Röding, 1798. Vita Malacologica 1: 39-48

External links
 
  Wieneke, U. 2010. Stromboidea Rostellariidae Rimellopsis Lambiotte, 1979. Gastropoda Stromboidea website

Rostellariidae